Kazagići is a village in the municipality of Kiseljak, in central Bosnia and Herzegovina.

Demographics 
According to the 2013 census, its population was 166.

References

Populated places in Kiseljak